Serge Patrice Thibodeau (born August 11, 1959) is a Canadian writer. He is a two-time winner of the Governor General's Award for French-language poetry, winning at the 1996 Governor General's Awards for Le Quatuor de l'errance and La Traversée du désert, and at the 2007 Governor General's Awards for Seul on est, and won the Prix Émile-Nelligan in 1992 for Le cycle de Prague.

Life
Originally from Rivière-Verte, New Brunswick, Thibodeau was educated at the Université de Moncton and Université Laval. Based in Montreal through the 1980s and 1990s, he returned to Moncton, New Brunswick in the 2000s to serve as writer-in-residence at the Université de Moncton and as editorial director of Éditions Perce-Neige. He is also an active member of Amnesty International.

Honors
1991 - Prix France-Acadie, La Septième Chute
1992 - Prix Émile-Nelligan, Le Cycle de Prague
1993 - Nomination pour le Prix du Gouverneur général de poésie, Le Cycle de Prague
1994 - Prix Edgar-Lespérance, L'Appel des mots
1995 - Grand Prix du Festival international de la poésie, Le Quatuor de l'errance et pour Nous, l'étranger
1996 - Prix du Gouverneur général, Le Quatuor de l'errance suivi de La Traversée du désert
2001 - Prix Éloizes - Artiste de l'année en littérature par l'Académie des Arts et des Lettres de l'Atlantique, Le Roseau
2005 –  Prix Antonine-Maillet-Acadie Vie pour son recueil de poésie Que repose, publié aux Éditions Perce-Neige. 
2007 - Prix du Gouverneur général : poésie de langue française, Seul on est
2009 - Chevalier de l'Ordre de la Pléiade, ordre de la Francophonie et du dialogue des cultures

Works
 La septième chute Moncton N.-B. : Éditions d'Acadie, 1990, 181 p. ; 22 cm., 
 Le cycle de Prague Éditions d'Acadie, 1992, 155 p. ; 21 cm. 
 Le passage des glaces Trois-Rivières : Écrits des Forges ; Moncton : Perce-Neige, 1992, 99 p. ; 21 cm., 
 L'appel des mots L'Hexagone, Collection Itinéraires ; 22, 1993, 238 p. ; 23 cm.,  (br.)
 Nous, l'étranger Écrits des Forges ; Echternach (Luxembourg) : Éditions Phi, 1995, 84 p. ; 21 cm., 
 Le quatuor de l'errance suivi de La traversée du désert Montréal : L'Hexagone, L'Hexagone/Poésie, 1995, 252 p. ; 23 cm.,  (br.)
 Dans la cité Montréal : L'Hexagone, Collection Poésie, 1997, 182 p. ; 23 cm.,  (br.)
 Nocturnes Trois-Rivières : Écrits des Forges, 1997, 96 p. ; 21 cm.,  (br.)
 La disgrâce de l'humanité Montréal : VLB, Collection Partis pris actuels ; 16, 1999, 194 p. ; 22 cm.,  (br.)
 Le roseau Montréal : L'Hexagone, Poésie, 2000, 
 Du haut de mon arbre Éditions Perce-Neige, Collection Poésie, 2000, 83 p. ; 19 cm.,  (br.)
 Seuils Éditions Perce-Neige, Collection Poésie, 2002, 137 p. ; 19 cm.,  (br.)
 Que repose Moncton : Éditions Perce-neige, Collection Poésie, 2004, 111 p. ; 20 cm.,  (br.)
 Lieux cachés Moncton : Perce-Neige, 2005, 144 p., 
 Seul on est Éditions Perce-Neige, Collection Poésie, 2006, 53 p. ; 19 cm.  (br.)
 Les sept dernières paroles de Judas L'Hexagone, Collection L'appel des mots, 2008, 78 p. ; 18 cm.
 Journal de John Winslow à Grand Pré Éditions Perce-Neige, 2010, 312 p., 978-2-922992-57-1
 Sous la banquise Éditions du Noroît, 2013,

References

External links
  Archives of Serge Patrice Thibodeau (Fonds Serge Patrice Thibodeau, R11817) are held at Library and Archives Canada

1959 births
20th-century Canadian poets
21st-century Canadian poets
Canadian male poets
Canadian poets in French
Canadian human rights activists
Writers from Moncton
Living people
Governor General's Award-winning poets
Université de Moncton alumni
Université Laval alumni
Acadian people
People from Madawaska County, New Brunswick
20th-century Canadian male writers
21st-century Canadian male writers